John Ellis Broadnax (January 10, 1904 – November 22, 1986) was an American football player and coach.

Playing career
Broadnax played quarterback for the University School for Boys in Stone Mountain, Georgia. He led Bluebirds to a state title as a senior. Pup Phillips was coach.

He then went on to play for The University of Georgia.
Broadnax was quarterback for the 1927 Georgia Bulldogs "dream and wonder team" which defeated Yale on October 8, 1927.

Coaching career
Broadnax coached Georgia Military College and led the school to a state title in 1929.

He returned to his alma mater as a freshman coach in the 1930s and was an assistant athletic director from 1938 to 1948.

References

External links
 

1904 births
1986 deaths
American football quarterbacks
Georgia Bulldogs football players
High school football coaches in Georgia (U.S. state)
Georgia Bulldogs football coaches